Paul Martin (born 8 March 1965) is a Scottish football former player and coach. Martin played for Kilmarnock, Hamilton Academical, Stranraer (on loan), Dumbarton, Albion Rovers and Queen's Park during a 17-year playing career.

Martin was captain of the Dumbarton Second Division title-winning team of 1991–92. After retiring he coached at Queen's Park and had a couple of caretaker stints there as well serving as assistant manager.

Martin then managed Dumbarton, but was sacked after the club were relegated from the Second Division in June 2006.

He was then assistant manager to predecessor John McCormack at Albion Rovers. When McCormack moved to Hamilton Academical to become assistant manager to Billy Reid, Martin was promoted to the position of Albion Rovers manager.

Martin won the manager of the month award for the Third Division for September 2010, and again in April 2011.

Martin resigned as manager of Albion Rovers on 20 May 2012, immediately after defeating Stranraer in the Second Division Play-off final, citing health reasons for his decision.

As of December 2010, Martin was running a business called One Stop Roofing.

Managerial statistics

References

External links

Living people
1965 births
Footballers from Bellshill
Association football central defenders
Scottish footballers
Scottish Football League players
Kilmarnock F.C. players
Hamilton Academical F.C. players
Stranraer F.C. players
Dumbarton F.C. players
Albion Rovers F.C. players
Queen's Park F.C. players
Scottish football managers
Dumbarton F.C. managers
Albion Rovers F.C. managers
Scottish Football League managers